«Airship. From Zedlitz» («On the blue waves of the ocean ... ») is a ballad from the Napoleonic cycle Lermontov's poems, written and published in 1840. It is a free translation from the German language Austrian romantic writings of Joseph Christian Freiherr von Zedlitz, titled Das Geisterschiff ("ghost ship", 1832). The individual fragments of Russian poem were influenced by another ballad of the same Austrian author - "Night parade" (Die nächtliche Heerschau; 1827), published in Russian in 1836 in translation by Zhukovsky.

Illustrations 
The poem was illustrated by Veniamin Belkin, Ivan Bilibin, V.I. Komarov, Vladimir Konashevich (ed.), Dmitry Mitrohin, L.M. Nepomnyashchii, Leonid Pasternak, Vardges Sureniants, Paul Chmaroff and others.

References

Literature 
 
 

Poetry by Mikhail Lermontov